Svetlana is a French singer who represented Luxembourg in the Eurovision Song Contest 1982, with her song entitled "Cours après le temps" ("Run After Time"). The song finished sixth with a total of 78 points.

Her birth name is Claire de Loutchek. Her recording career did not last long as it ended after four singles were released. In 2013, a compilation album was released.

Singles discography
 "Quand ta lettre est arrivée" (1981)
 "Cours après le temps" (1982)
 "Portrait d`un enfant" (1983)
 "Je suis blonde...et alors ?" (1983)

References

Eurovision Song Contest entrants for Luxembourg
Eurovision Song Contest entrants of 1982